Car tuning is the modification of a car to optimise it for a different set of performance requirements from those it was originally designed to meet. Most commonly this is higher engine performance and dynamic handling characteristics but cars may also be altered to provide better fuel economy, or smoother response. The goal when tuning is the improvement of a vehicle's overall performance in response to the user's needs. Often, tuning is done at the expense of emissions performance, component reliability and occupant comfort.

As a culture has grown around modified cars the term tuning has grown to encompass the cosmetic and stylistic changes owners make to personalize their vehicles. These changes can range from functional modifications designed to improve the performance or functionality of the car, to visual modifications which alter the aesthetics of the car and, in the case of certain mods, sometimes be detrimental to the performance or functionality of the car.

Origin

Since their invention, cars have always been subject to aftermarket modification. Both moderate and radical modification have been commemorated in the popular songs Hot Rod Race and Hot Rod Lincoln.  The names of Abarth and Cooper appear on models styled after the cars they modified. With support from Ford, renowned engine manufacturer Cosworth went from modifying English Flathead engines for Lotus Sevens to dominating Formula One racing.

In the 1970s and 1980s, many Japanese performance cars were never exported outside the Japanese domestic market. In the late 1980s and early 1990s, grey import vehicles of Japanese performance cars, such as the Nissan Skyline, began to be privately imported into Western Europe and North America.  In the United States, this was in direct contrast to domestic car production around the same time, where there was a very small performance aftermarket for domestic compact and economy cars; the focus was instead on sports cars or muscle cars such as the Ford Mustang and Chevrolet Corvette.

Because of their light weight and the increasing availability of inexpensive tuning equipment, tuned economy and compact cars exhibit high performance at a low cost in comparison to dedicated sports cars. As professional sporting and racing with such vehicles increased, so did recreational use of these vehicles. Many drivers would modify their vehicles in an attempt to emulate versions of racing vehicles.

Areas of modification
The essence of modification of a tuner car is an attempt at a significant performance increase—or the appearance of high performance—from a stock motor vehicle through the addition, alteration or outright replacement of parts. Although this largely involves modifying the engine and management systems of the vehicle to increase power output, additional changes are often required to allow the vehicle to handle such power, including stiffened suspension, widened tires, better brakes, and improved steering and transmission modifications (such as the installation of a short shifter). Although largely insignificant in terms of appearance, certain modifications such as low-profile tires, altered suspension, and the addition of spoilers can change the overall appearance of the car, as well as adding downforce to increase traction.

Audio
A stock audio system is one specified by the manufacturer when the vehicle was built in the factory. A custom audio installation can involve anything from the upgrade of the radio to a full customization based around specific audio equipment. Events are held where entrants compete for the loudest, highest-quality audio reception or most innovative sound systems. Some common modifications include higher quality speakers and subwoofers, amplifiers, and better wiring.

Interior

Race cars competing in various classes must adhere to a strict set of regulations. As in some well-known racing events, like NASCAR and NHRA, sanctioned events often require a minimum vehicle weight.  In such cases, the interior is stripped, and the required weight is achieved by adding ballast, allowing precise control over weight distribution. Along with weight requirements, safety requirements are present. Requirements differ for different classes. Roll cages, fire extinguishers, reinforced bucket seats, seat harnesses, and the like are some of the required safety modifications. Roll cages may be difficult to install when the stock interior is present.

Some tuners will have "gutted" interiors, or omit features that many ordinary drivers would find desirable or necessary, such as audio systems, air conditioning and soundproofing, in order to reduce vehicle weight.

Engine tuning

Engine tuning is the process of modifying the operating characteristics of an engine. In a typical engine set-up, there are various mechanical and electronic elements such as the intake manifold, spark plugs, and mass air flow sensor. Modern engines employ the use of an engine control unit to provide the best balance between performance and emissions. Via the OBD communications protocol, electronically controlled aspects of the engine can be modified in a process known as mapping. Mapping can either be performed by changing the software within the ECU (chip tuning via firmware modification), or by providing false data via plug-in hardware. Other standalone engine management systems are available; these systems replace the factory computer with one that is user-programmable.

Mechanical components of the engine can also be added or replaced, such as forced induction systems like turbochargers or superchargers.

Improper, incorrect and poorly executed engine modifications can have a detrimental effect on performance and reliability. Mechanical and electrical components can suffer or simply fail as a result. An example would be the use of an air compressor such as a turbocharger to increase the volume of air used in the power stroke of the Otto cycle. In a typical chemical reaction, the air–fuel ratio must be a minimum of 14:1. If higher ratios are used, higher pressures and temperatures are observed in the cylinders, which can quickly push an engine beyond its intended design limits.

Neglecting such operating parameters can lead to premature failures, such as warped cylinder heads and walls, disintegrated piston rings, cracked or bent connecting rods and crankshafts, total cooling system failure, engine fire, engine detonation, engine seizing, and even blowouts. This can all lead to very expensive repairs, as well as being very dangerous.

Suspension tuning
Suspension tuning involves modifying the springs, shock absorbers, anti-roll bars, and other related components. Shorter springs offer greater stiffness and a lower center of gravity at the possible cost of unwanted changes of suspension geometry. Stiffer shock absorbers improve dynamic weight shifting during cornering and normally have shorter internals to stop them from bottoming out when shorter springs are used. Stiffer sway bars reduce body roll during cornering, thus improving the grip that the tires have on the surface by reducing suspension geometry changes caused by roll; this also improves handling response due to faster weight shifting—similar to stiffer springs.

The danger with overly stiff anti-roll bars is the lifting of the inner wheel, causing a loss of traction. By increasing the roll resistance of one end of the car, weight transfer is concentrated at that end, causing it to slip more than the other. This effect is used to control the over/understeer characteristic as well as to reduce roll. Other components that are sometimes added are strut bars, which improve body stiffness and help better maintain proper suspension geometry during cornering. On some cars, certain braces or anti-roll bars can be retrofitted to base model cars from sports models.

For offroad vehicles, the emphasis is on lengthening the suspension travel and installing larger tires. Larger tires—with or without larger wheels—increase ground clearance, travel over rough terrain more smoothly, provide additional cushioning, and decrease ground pressure (which is important on soft surfaces).

These suspension modifications are in contrast to lowriders, which use hydraulic or pneumatic suspensions. Lowriders use another type of suspension tuning in which the height of each individual wheel can be rapidly adjusted by a system of rams which, in some cases, makes it possible to "bounce" the wheels completely off of the ground.

Body tuning
Body tuning involves making modifications to the body of the car in order to alter the aesthetics of the car, improve performance, or both. Body tuning can also involve changing or replacing parts for better aerodynamic performance. Through downforce, cornering speeds and tire adhesion can be improved, often at the expense of increased drag. To lighten the vehicle, bodywork components such as hoods and rearview mirrors may be replaced with lighter-weight components.

Often, body modifications are done mainly to improve a vehicle's appearance, as in the case of non-functioning scoops, wide arches or other aesthetic modification.  Aftermarket spoilers or body kits rarely improve a car's performance. The majority, in fact, add weight and increase the drag coefficient of the vehicle, thus reducing its overall performance.

Dating back to the 1940s, chopping and channeling was a popular method of modifying a car's aerodynamics.

Increasing the wheel track width through spacers and wide body kits, or lowering the center of gravity via suspension modifications, can enhance the car's cornering ability. Often, suspension tuners unfamiliar with spring dynamics will cut stock springs, producing a harder, bouncy ride. It is also common to stance a car, lowering it beyond its optimal ride height purely for appearance.

Competition cars may have lightweight windows, or the windows may be completely removed, as auto glass adds significant weight and detrimentally alters weight distribution.  Plastic windows are much more vulnerable to scratches, which reduce service life.

Tires
Tires have large effects on a car's behavior and are replaced periodically; therefore, tire selection is a very cost-effective way to personalize an automobile. Choices include tires for various weather and road conditions, different sizes and various compromises between cost, grip, service life, rolling resistance, handling and ride comfort. Drivers also sometimes personalize tires for aesthetic reasons, for example, by adding tire lettering.

Detuning
Detuning is the process returning a modified car to its original factory status, or reducing its performance in a particular area of tuning.  For example, a car may be "detuned" to allow increased traction when the track grip is not sufficient to handle the increased power of the tuned engine.

Styles of modification

Modified cars can be significantly different from their stock counterparts. A common factor among owners/modifiers is to emulate the visual and/or performance characteristics of established styles and design principles. These similarities may be unintentional. Some of the many different styles and visual influences to car modification are:

 Cal look: A modified classic Volkswagen intended to evoke California through the use of bright colours, trim, and accessories.
 Drag car: Cars modified for drag racing
 Drift car: Cars modified for drifting.
 Dub or donk or Hi-Riser: Characterized by extremely large, ostentatious wheels with low-profile tires, loud speaker setups, and abnormally high ride height.
 Euro style: Stanced with one-off paint and small wheels, with shaved features to define car body lines.
 German look: A Volkswagen Type 1, Type 3, or Karmann Ghia lowered and fitted with late model Porsche mag wheels and touring car-influenced styling. Heavily modified suspension and drivetrain with emphasis on handling and cornering.
 Hot rod: Style largely consisting of period-specific vehicles, components, and finishes to reproduce characteristics of early drag cars from the 1930s and 1940s.
 Import or JDM: tuned Japanese vehicles.
 Itasha: cars decorated with images of characters from anime, manga, or video games
 Kaido Racer: Japanese style of cars typically with lowered suspension, bright paintjobs, extreme bodykits and extended exhausts, sometimes inspired by Japanese Group 5 "Super Silhouette" racecars. Commonly associated with the Bōsōzoku.
 Kustom: Style largely consisting of American cars built from the 1930s to 1960s customized in the styles of that period.
 Lowrider: Hydraulic or airbag suspension setups, custom paint, pinstriping, custom interior, and, typically, small diameter wire wheels. Others may look like straight restorations, aside from a low stance.
 Military/service style: Cars designed to look like certain service vehicles.
 Outlaw: A modified with more powerful engines and brakes Porsches 356, 911 and Karmann Ghia with more aggressive appearance. This movement took place in Southern California in 1960s.
 Rally car: Cars built to compete in rallies.
 Rat rod: Style of hot rod and custom cars, imitating the "unfinished" appearance of some hot rods in the 1940s, 1950s, and 1960s. "Rat style" also defines a car that is kept on the road despite visible heavy wear.
 Restomod: Classic cars that combine original exterior styling with modern applied technologies (such as new suspension, wheels, transmission) or modern interior features (multimedia etc.) for comfortable everyday use.
 Siren kings: A New Zealand Pasifika subculture where cars or bicycles are modified with loudspeakers or public address systems for use in competitive battles.
 South London look: Subtly modified 50's-70's British Fords that are lowered, with pastel paint and 13 inch Lotus Cortina steel wheels or RS, Minilite, or Revolution mag wheels. These cars often use a tuned Ford Kent or Pinto engine.
 Slab: Originated in the Houston area since the mid-1980s—usually, a full-size American luxury car is fitted with custom "elbows", a type of extended wire wheels which protrude out from the fenders, loud speaker setups, and neon signage inside the trunk panel. Other "slab" modifications include hydraulic-actuated trunk panels (a "pop trunk"), candy paint, vertical stainless steel trim on the trunk panel (known as "belt buckles"), aftermarket grille, and the use of a Cadillac front-end sheet metal conversion. The interiors of slabs are usually clad in beige or tan (in what is called a "peanut butter interior"). Usually associated with Houston hip hop music.
 Sleeper: Stock-looking cars with performance upgrades.
 Stanced: This style is mostly associated with sports and passenger cars with lowered suspension setups. Custom wheels with low-profile tires play a large role in this style and often feature aggressive sizes, offsets, and camber.
 VIP style: A Japanese style of customizing luxury cars that evolved from Bōsōzoku.

Glossary

Legal requirements
Many countries or municipalities have legal requirements which govern vehicle modifications. For example, all vehicles in Victoria, Australia, must conform to construction standards to ensure vehicle safety. There are also restrictions for P Plate drivers which can prevent young drivers from driving modified vehicles.

Many developed countries have smog regulations, which generally forbid any modifications to engines or related components unless the modifications themselves are certified, like production car models. Such modifications, even if they do not actually result in increased emissions, prevent legal use on public roads.

Sanctioning organizations
Various organizations involved in competitive motorsports such as the FIA, SFI, NHRA, and IHRA, amongst others, act as sanctioning bodies to establish safety guidelines for racing events, series, tracks, vehicles, and parts. The FIA is the largest international motorsports governing body, with FIA certification being required for a number of parts, particularly safety equipment, in FIA sanctioned events, as well as in many non FIA events.

See also
Custom car
Automotive aftermarket
 Automotive restoration
 Auto racing
 Virtual tuning
 SEMA

References

 
 
 
 
 
 

Vehicle modifications